The nats (MLCTS: nat) are god-like spirits venerated in Myanmar and neighbouring countries in conjunction with Buddhism. They are divided between the 37 Great Nats who were designated that status by King Anawrahta when he formalized the official list of nats. Most of the 37 Great Nats were human beings who met violent deaths.

There are two types of nats in Burmese Belief: nat sein which are humans that were deified after their deaths and all the other nats which are spirits of nature (spirits of water, trees etc.).

Much like sainthood, nats can be designated for a variety of reasons, including those only known in certain regions in Burma. Nat worship is less common in urban areas than in rural areas and is practised among ethnic minorities of Myanmar as well as in mainstream Bamar society. However, it is among the Theravada Buddhist Bamar that the most highly developed form of ceremony and ritual is seen.

Every Burmese village has a nat kun (နတ်ကွန်း) or nat sin which essentially serves as a shrine to the village guardian nat called the ywa saung nat. Individual houses also have a shrine to a nat, usually a coconut is hung on a corner of the house or property, surrounded by perfume as an offering. One may inherit a certain member or in some instances two of the 37 Great Nats as mi hsaing hpa hsaing from one or both parents' side to worship depending on where their families originally come from. One also has a personal guardian deity called ko saung nat.

Nat worship and Buddhism

Academic opinions vary as to whether Burmese Buddhism and Burmese spirit worship are two separate entities, or merged into a single religion. As with a rise of globalization, the importance of the nat religion on modern Myanmar and its people has been diminished. The formalizing of the official 37 Great Nats by King Anawrahta (1044–1077) of Bagan, has been interpreted as Burmanisation and establishment of Bamar supremacy in the Irrawaddy valley after the unification of the country and founding of the First Burmese Empire.
Worship of nats predates Buddhism in Burma. With the arrival of Buddhism, however, the nats were syncretically merged with Buddhism.

Nat worship and ecology

The widespread traditional belief among rural folks that there are forest guardian spirits called taw saung nats and mountain guardian spirits called taung saung nats appears to act as a deterrent against environmental destruction up to a point. Indiscriminate felling particularly of large trees is generally eschewed owing to the belief that they are dwellings of tree spirits called yokkazo (tree spirit) and that such an act would bring the wrath of the nat upon the perpetrator.

Popular nat festivals

The most important nat pilgrimage site in Burma is Mount Popa, an extinct volcano with numerous temples and relic sites atop a mountain 1300 metres tall located near Bagan in central Burma. The annual festival is held on the full moon of the month of Natdaw (December) of the Burmese calendar. Taungbyone, north of Mandalay in Madaya Township, is another major site with the festival held each year starting on the eleventh waxing day and including the full moon in the month Wagaung (August). Yadanagu at Amarapura, held a week later in honour of Popa Medaw ("Mother of Popa"), who was the mother of the Taungbyone Min Nyinaung ("Brother Lords"), is also a popular nat festival.

Nats are ascribed human characteristics, wants, and needs; they are flawed, having desires considered derogatory and immoral in mainstream Buddhism. During a nat pwè, which is a festival during which nats are propitiated, nat kadaws ( "wife of the spirit", i.e. "medium, shaman") dance and embody the nats. Historically, the nat kadaw profession was hereditary and passed from mother to daughter. Until the 1980s, few nat gadaws were male. Since the 1980s, persons identified by outsiders as trans women have increasingly performed these roles.

Music, often accompanied by a hsaing waing ("orchestra"), adds much to the mood of the nat pwè, and many are entranced. People come from far to take part in the festivities in various
shrines called nat kun or nat naan, get drunk on palm wine and dance wildly in fits of ecstasy to the wild beat of the Hsaing waing music, possessed by the nats.

Whereas nat pwès are annual events celebrating a particular member of the 37 Great Nats regarded as the tutelary spirit in a local region within a local community, with familial custodians of the place and tradition and with royal sponsorship in ancient times, hence evocative of royal rituals, there are also nat kannah pwès where individuals would have a pavilion set up in a neighbourhood and the ritual is generally linked to the entire pantheon of nats. The nat kadaws as an independent profession made their appearance in the latter half of the 19th century as spirit mediums, and nat kannahs are more of an urban phenomenon which evolved to satisfy the need of people who had migrated from the countryside to towns and cities but who wished to carry on their traditions or yo-ya of supplicating the mi hsaing hpa hsaing tutelary deities of their native place.

List of official nats

King Anawrahta of Bagan (1044–1077) designated an official pantheon of 37 Great Nats after he had failed to enforce a ban on nat worship. His stratagem of incorporation eventually succeeded by bringing nats to Shwezigon Pagoda portrayed worshipping Gautama Buddha and by enlisting Śakra, a Buddhist protective deity, to head the pantheon above the Mahagiri nats as Thagyamin. Seven out of the 37 Great Nats appear to be directly associated with the life and times of Anawrahta.

The official pantheon is made up predominantly of those from the royal houses of Burmese history, but also contains nats of Thai (Yun Bayin) and Shan (Maung Po Tu) descent; illustrations of them show them in Burmese royal dress. Listed in proper order, they are:

 Thagyamin
 Min Mahagiri
 Hnamadawgyi
 Shwe Nabay
 Thonbanhla
 Taungoo Mingaung
 Mintara
 Thandawgan
 Shwe Nawrahta
 Aungzwamagyi
 Ngazi Shin
 Aung Pinle Hsinbyushin
 Taungmagyi
 Maungminshin
 Shindaw
 Nyaunggyin
 Tabinshwehti
 Minye Aungdin
 Shwe Sitthin
 Medaw Shwezaga
 Maung Po Tu
 Yun Bayin
 Maung Minbyu
 Mandalay Bodaw
 Shwe Hpyin Naungdaw (‌)
 Shwe Hpyin Nyidaw
 Mintha Maungshin
 Htibyuhsaung
 Htibyuhsaung Medaw
 Pareinma Shin Mingaung
 Min Sithu
 Min Kyawzwa
 Myaukhpet Shinma
 Anauk Mibaya
 Shingon
 Shingwa
 Shin Nemi

See also
 Burmese folk religion
 Deva (Buddhism)
 Hungry ghost
 Lên đồng
 Preta

References

 'King Mae Ku: From Lan Na Monarch to Burmese Nat', in: Forbes, Andrew, and Henley, David, Ancient Chiang Mai Volume 1. Chiang Mai, Cognoscenti Books, 2012.
 
 
 
 Hla Tha Mein

External links
 
 Nat belief and Buddhism Photo essay by Claudia Wiens
 The Nats - Online Burma/Myanmar Library
 Friends in High Places Preview of a documentary film by Lindsey Merrison
 Nat Dance YouTube
 Mintha Theater Dance theater in Mandalay, Burma.
 Spirit of Burma 2006
 Nat Pwè recordings
 The Nat Spirits and Burmese Animism Windows on Asia, Michigan State University
 Myanmar Cyclone Brings Rise in Centuries-Old 'Nat' Worship The Wall Street Journal, June 30, 2008, video and photo slideshows
 Festival brings noise and colour to Taungbyone Zaw Win Than, The Myanmar Times Vol. 22 No. 430, August 4–10, 2008
 Myanmar Nat Pwe in Bago Flickr photos by Boonlong1
 My House Nat Can Whip Your House Nat Ethan Todras-Whitehill, Student Traveler, 2006-11-24
 An account of the Taungbyone 2010 nat pwe spirit festival at Arcane Candy Part 1 and Part 2
 Myanmar's River of Spirits Kira Salak, National Geographic. May 2006
 The Thirty Seven Nats. A Phase of Spirit-Worship prevailing in Burma | Southeast Asia Digital Library

 
Buddhism in Myanmar
Tutelary deities
Burmese legendary creatures